Order of Loyalty and Diligence (Traditional Chinese:忠勤勳章) is a military award from the Republic of China. It was created on 23 September 1944 for person who contributes 10 years' service in the military and meeting academic criteria.

Reference list

Orders, decorations, and medals of the Republic of China
Awards established in 1944